Koriabo is a community in the Barima-Waini region of Guyana, standing at an altitude of 36 metres. Barima and Koriba form an Amerindian community which is mainly inhabited by Warao people with a minority of Arawak and Kalina people.

Dutch plantations were established in the area in the 1760s. Koriabo was established as a mission in 1946. The economy is based on subsistence farming. Gold mining in the area is threatening the water supply.

References

Bibliography

Populated places in Barima-Waini
Indigenous villages in Guyana